Santa Elena District may refer to:

 Santa Elena, Paraguay, a district of the Cordillera department
 Santa Elena District, La Cruz, in Guanacaste province, Costa Rica